More Bountiful is a Hong Kong based Thoroughbred racehorse.

In the season of 2008–2009, More Bountiful has topped that performance by reeling off six wins to go from Class 4 to domestic Group Two Chairman's Trophy (1600) champion in his maiden season. This horse has also a lock on the Most-Improved Horse title for his meteoric ratings rise of 72 points from 52 to 124 from 11 outings. More Bountiful also is one of the nominees of Hong Kong Horse of the Year.

Profile
 Sire: Van Nistelrooy
 Dam: Centaine Gu Li
 Sex: Gelding
 Country : 
 Colour : Brown
 Owner : Lucky Lord Syndicate 
 Trainer : John Size
 Record : (No. of 1-2-3-Starts) 6-1-0-11 (As of 27 February 2012)
 Earnings :  HK$6,335,000 (As of 27 February 2012)

References
 The Hong Kong Jockey Club – More Bountiful Racing Record
 The Hong Kong Jockey Club

Racehorses trained in Hong Kong
Hong Kong racehorses
Racehorses bred in New Zealand
2004 racehorse births
Thoroughbred family 3-i